St Joseph's GAA Club, Ballycran is a Gaelic Athletic Association club located in Rubane, County Down, Northern Ireland.  The club is exclusively concerned with hurling and camogie. The club competes in Down GAA competitions and in Division 1 of the Antrim Hurling League. The Club's grounds are called 'McKenna Park' and house the John Mallon Stand (capacity 5,000).  McKenna Park is the home ground for the county hurlers.

Achievements
Down Senior Hurling Championships: 27 ‘'
 1949, 1953, 1957, 1958, 1960, 1961, 1967, 1972, 1974, 1976, 1977, 1979, 1980, 1984, 1985, 1986, 1987, 1993, 1994, 1995, 2007, 2009, 2011, 2015, 2018, 2019, 2021Ulster Senior Club Hurling Championships: 3''' 
 1974, 1976, 1993

Notable players
 Greg Blaney
 Gary Savage
 Noel Keith

References

External links
Down GAA site
Ballycran web site
Ballycran Facebook page

Gaelic games clubs in County Down
Hurling clubs in County Down